is a maze video game developed and published by Hudson Soft. The original home computer game  was released in July 1983 for the NEC PC-8801, NEC PC-6001 mkII, Fujitsu FM-7, Sharp MZ-700, Sharp MZ-2000, Sharp X1 and MSX in Japan, and a graphically modified version for the MSX and ZX Spectrum in Europe as Eric and the Floaters. A sequel, 3-D Bomberman, was produced. In 1985, Bomberman was released for the Nintendo Entertainment System. It spawned the Bomberman series with many installments building on its basic gameplay.

Gameplay

In the NES/Famicom release, the eponymous character, Bomberman, is a robot that must find his way through a maze while avoiding enemies. Doors leading to further maze rooms are found under rocks, which Bomberman must destroy with bombs. There are items that can help improve Bomberman's bombs, such as the Fire ability, which improves the blast range of his bombs. Bomberman will turn human when he escapes and reaches the surface. Each game has 50 levels in total. The original home computer games are more basic and have some different rules.

Notably, completing the NES and Famicom version reveals that the game is a prequel to Hudson Soft's NES port of Broderbund Software's 1983 game Lode Runner. Upon clearing the final screen, Bomberman is shown turning into Lode Runner's unnamed protagonist. In the Japanese version of the game, the player is explicitly told that Bomberman will 'See [them] in Lode Runner''', while in the international version, they are instead asked if they can recognise the protagonist from another Hudson game. 

DevelopmentBomberman was written in 1980 to serve as a tech demo for Hudson Soft's BASIC compiler. This very basic version of the game was given a small-scale release for Japanese PCs in 1983 and the European PCs the following year.
The Famicom version was developed (ported) by Shinichi Nakamoto, who reputedly completed the task alone over a 72 hour period.
According to Zero magazine, Bomberman adopted gameplay elements from the Coreland/Sega arcade hit Pengo (1982).

The European home computer versions were released as Eric and the Floaters to avoid any association with a series of terrorist bombings carried out by the Irish Republican Army during The Troubles.

Enhanced ports and re-releasesBomberman is most known for the NES version released in Japan on December 19, 1985 and in North America in January 1989. Hudson Soft's director of research and development, Shinichi Nakamoto, commented in a 1995 interview that "I personally believe that the Famicom version of Bomberman is the one and only version of the game." This version was ported back to the MSX the following year as Bomberman Special. Bomberman's appearance in this game (Hudson Soft re-used an enemy graphic taken from their own 1984 NES/Famicom port of Broderbund's Lode Runner) is an early version of Bomberman's more famous design, a robotic anime-like character with a pink antenna. The game was also released on Game Boy as a "Game B" mode of the game Atomic Punk. In 2004, this version of Bomberman was re-released for the Game Boy Advance as part of the Famicom Mini series in Japan and the Classic NES Series in North America and Europe. It was released in the same year for the N-Gage.

A remake/update was released for the PlayStation, titled Bomberman in Japan and Europe, and renamed Bomberman Party Edition'' in North America. This release features a port of the original version of the single-player game as well as a revised and updated version with pre-rendered 3D graphics and contemporary audio. The updated graphics and audio were also used for the multiplayer aspect of the game.

See also
 List of Bomberman video games
 Last man standing (video games)

Notes

References

Other sources
Top Secret Passwords Nintendo Player's Guide
Bomberman Operation Manual, NES-BM-USA, Hudson Soft USA

External links
 
 Bomberman (Family Computer) - Hudson Game Navi - Hudson Soft (Japanese) on Wayback Machine

1983 video games
Bomberman
Famicom Disk System games
FM-7 games
Game Boy Advance games
Mobile games
MSX games
NEC PC-6001 games
NEC PC-8801 games
Nintendo Entertainment System games
PlayStation Portable games
Puzzle video games
Sharp MZ games
Sharp X1 games
Video games about slavery
Video games developed in Japan
Video games scored by Jun Chikuma
ZX Spectrum games
N-Gage games
Multiplayer and single-player video games
Strategy video games
Single-player video games
Hudson Soft games